Apsnypress is the de facto state press agency of Abkhazia. Its stated goals is to assist in development of democracy, sovereignty and independence of the breakaway Abkhaz republic and to ensure the information security thereof.

Detailed objectives

Apsnypress is dedicated to collecting, processing, publishing and distributing information pertaining to all sorts of events taking place in Abkhazia or otherwise concerning it. Its other activities include:

 Establishing trends; modeling the development of political and socio-economic tendencies
 Collaborating with the foreign media; accommodating the foreign journalists
 Developing the media network within the republic and abroad
 Improving the staff's professional skills; continuously recruiting of the journalists with knowledge of Russian, Abkhaz and English languages
 Prompt publishing of the Abkhazian laws, presidential decrees and cabinet's decisions; its analysis, generalization and studying and publishing the responses to thereof 
 Prompt publishing of statements and appeals by the government bodies and its officials.
 Reflecting the broad array of opinions regarding the important political, socio-economic and cultural events of Abkhazia.
 Preparing and distributing the daily news bulletins
 Preparing and distributing the press reviews
 Organizing the press-conferences and briefings for the senior government officials
 Information activities in the fields of TV and radio broadcasting; preparation of the self and jointly produced TV a radio programmes
 Carrying out the sociological studies, surveys and analyzing thereof

History
Apnypress was founded on 31 January 1995.

Following the May 2014 Revolution and the election of Raul Khajimba as President, on 23 September 2014 he replaced Manana Gurgulia as Head of Apsnypress with Renata Chagava.

See also

References

News agencies based in Abkhazia
Mass media in Sukhumi